Lingle can refer to:

People
 Jake Lingle (1891–1930), American newspaper reporter and racketeer
 Linda Lingle (born 1953), former governor of Hawaii
 Walter Lee Lingle (1868–1956), 11th president of Davidson College

Places in the United States
 Lingle, Wyoming, a town
 Lingle Creek, Iowa
 Lingle Lake, a former name of Dewart Lake, Indiana